The Charlotte Knights are a Minor League Baseball team of the International League and the Triple-A affiliate of the Chicago White Sox. They are located in Charlotte, North Carolina, and play their home games at Truist Field, which opened in 2014 and is located in Uptown Charlotte. The team previously played at Knights Park (1976–1988), Knights Castle (1989), and Knights Stadium (1990–2013).

Established as a Double-A franchise of the Southern League in 1976, the team was known as the Charlotte Orioles, or Charlotte O's, through 1987. The O's won the Southern League championship twice: in 1980 and 1984 as the Double-A affiliate of the Baltimore Orioles. They were rebranded as the Knights in 1988.

The Knights were replaced by a Triple-A International League team in 1993 in conjunction with the expansion of Major League Baseball (MLB). The Triple-A Knights carried on the history of the Double-A team that preceded them. In conjunction with MLB's restructuring of Minor League Baseball in 2021, the Knights were shifted to the Triple-A East, but this was renamed the International League in 2022. The Knights have won two International League championships: in 1993 as the Triple-A affiliate of the Cleveland Indians and again in 1999 as the Triple-A affiliate of the Chicago White Sox.

History

Prior professional baseball in Charlotte

The first professional baseball team in Charlotte was the Charlotte Hornets, who played only a single season. In 1900, the city was home to the Charlotte Presbyterians. A year later, a new Hornets team formed. The Hornets competed in various leagues for 66 seasons through 1972. In 1937, the Washington Senators, later the Minnesota Twins, purchased the team. The Hornets remained a minor league affiliate of the Senators/Twins for 35 years. In 1940, Calvin Griffith, the son of Senators owner Clark Griffith and future owner of the Senators/Twins, built an approximately 5,000-seat park in Charlotte's Dilworth neighborhood, Clark Griffith Park. It would be the home of Charlotte baseball for the next half-century.

After spending most of the first half of the 20th century in the low minors (in some years, as low as Class D–equivalent to a Rookie-level team today), the Hornets joined the Class A South Atlantic League (SAL) in 1954. They had previously been members of the SAL in the 1920s. The league became a Double-A circuit in 1963, and was reorganized as the Southern League in 1964. In 1972, Charlotte was home to two teams: the Hornets and Minnesota's Class A affiliate in the Western Carolinas League, the Charlotte Twins. After a lackluster season, however, the Twins were moved to Orlando, Florida, as the Orlando Twins. The Hornets also disbanded after the 1972 season, leaving the city without professional baseball.

Southern League (1976–1992) 

In 1976, professional wrestling promoter Jim Crockett Jr. and his family bought the Asheville Orioles, the Double-A affiliate of the Baltimore Orioles, and relocated the club from Asheville, North Carolina, to Charlotte as the Charlotte Orioles. Crockett renovated Griffith Park and renamed it Jim Crockett Memorial Park. Popularly known as the O's, the club joined the Southern League and inherited the Asheville team's status as the Orioles' Double-A affiliate. 

The Southern League used a split-season schedule wherein the division winners from each half qualified for the postseason championship playoffs. Charlotte won the First Half Eastern Division title in their inaugural 1976 season, but they lost the Eastern Division title versus the Orlando Twins in a one-game playoff. The team featured pitcher Dave Ford, who won the Southern League Most Outstanding Pitcher Award, and future Baseball Hall of Famer Eddie Murray at first base. Charlotte won another first half title in 1979 but were again eliminated in the Eastern Division series by the Columbus Astros, 2–0.

Manager Jimmy Williams led the 1980 O's to end the season with an even 72–72 record and the first half title. They then swept the Savannah Braves in a three-game series for the Eastern Division title and defeated the Memphis Chicks, 3–1, to win their first Southern League championship. The 1980 team included future Hall of Famer Cal Ripken Jr. at third base. The Orioles returned to the postseason four years later when managers Grady Little and John Hart led them to a 75–72 record and the second half title. They defeated the Greenville Braves, 3–1, for the Eastern Division title before winning their second league championship over the Knoxville Blue Jays, 3–0. Ken Dixon was selected as the league's Most Outstanding Pitcher.

In March 1985, the mostly wood-framed Crockett Park was destroyed by fire. An investigation revealed arson as the cause. The Crockett family built a 3,000-seat makeshift stadium immediately afterward, which served as the O's home for two years. However, unlike its predecessor, it was completely exposed to the elements, causing a steep decline in attendance. The 1985 O's won a second half title and the Eastern Division over Columbus, 3–1, but lost the Southern League title to the Huntsville Stars, 3–2. Similarly, the 1987 first-half champion O's won the division title versus the Jacksonville Expos, 3–2, but lost the league crown to the Birmingham Barons, 3–1. Third baseman Tom Dodd was selected for the 1987 Southern League Most Valuable Player Award.

Following the 1987 season, George Shinn, founder of the National Basketball Association's Charlotte Hornets, bought the team from the Crockett family and committed to building a permanent ballpark. In 1988, the team was renamed the Charlotte Knights in a naming contest, and Crockett Park was renamed Knights Park. The team's 13-year affiliation with Baltimore ended after the 1988 season.

In 1989, Shinn moved the Knights to Knights Castle, a temporary 8,000-seat stadium located just over the state line in Fort Mill, South Carolina, near the construction site of their permanent home, Knights Stadium. The stadium was built solely for the 1989 season and was demolished following the final game that year to make room for the completion of the 10,000-seat Knights Stadium. Along with a new ballpark, the Knights also had a new major league affiliate in the Chicago Cubs. Laddie Renfroe won the 1989 Southern League Most Outstanding Pitcher Award. Charlotte returned to the playoffs in 1992, but they lost the Eastern Division title to Greenville, who had won both halves of the season.

International League (1993–2020) 

In conjunction with the 1993 Major League Baseball expansion, team owner George Shinn was granted an expansion franchise in the Triple-A International League (IL), which would begin playing in Charlotte in 1993. Shinn, who had applied for Charlotte to receive one of two available Triple-A expansion teams, was recommended by the expansion committee after their visit to evaluate the city. Of the nine applicant cities, Charlotte had the newest stadium, the only major league sports franchise (Shinn's Charlotte Hornets), and the largest metro area population. It would be the first time that a Carolinas-based team would play at the highest level of minor league baseball.

Gaining a Triple-A team meant Shinn would need to relocate, or sell, his existing Southern League team as the higher classification team held the rights to the territory. He solicited offers to purchase the club to help defray a US$5 million International League enfranchisement cost. Shinn initially sold the Double-A franchise to Tom Benson, owner of the National Football League's New Orleans Saints, who sought to relocate the club to New Orleans, but the move was blocked when Minor League Baseball granted territorial rights to the higher-classification Triple-A Denver Zephyrs, who wanted to move to New Orleans after being uprooted by the Colorado Rockies National League expansion team. Benson eventually opted out of the purchase. Without a ballpark for the 1994 season, Larry Schmittou, president and owner of the Triple-A Nashville Sounds, offered Herschel Greer Stadium in Nashville, Tennessee, as a temporary ballpark for the displaced team until Shinn could find a permanent location. So, the team relocated there in 1993 as the Nashville Xpress.

The Triple-A Charlotte Knights carried on the history and identity of the preceding Double-A team and became the Triple-A affiliate of the Cleveland Indians. In 1993, Charlie Manuel managed the Knights to win the Western Division title with an 86–55 record. They then defeated the Richmond Braves, 3–1, in the semifinals to advance to the Governors' Cup finals for the International League championship. In the best-of-five series, Charlotte won their first IL championship over the Rochester Red Wings, 3–2. Third baseman Jim Thome, who was later inducted in the Baseball Hall of Fame, won the 1993 International League Most Valuable Player Award with the Knights. The 1994 squad made a push for a second IL title, but lost the semifinals versus Richmond, 3–1. Much of the core of the 1993–94 Knights, including Manuel, would help lead the Indians to the World Series in 1995 and 1997.

In 1995, the Knights switched their affiliation to the Florida Marlins. Over four years with Florida, Charlotte's only postseason appearance occurred in 1997. As in their previous playoff run, they were eliminated in the semifinals by the Columbus Clippers, 3–1. In 1996, left fielder Billy McMillon was selected as the IL Rookie of the Year.

Before the 1997 season, Shinn sold the Knights to North Carolina businessman Don Beaver, who negotiated a Triple-A affiliation with the Chicago White Sox, which began in 1999. Manager Tom Spencer led the Knights to win the IL Wild Card that season with an 82–62 record. They defeated the Scranton/Wilkes-Barre Red Barons, 3–2, in the semifinals before winning their second IL championship against the Durham Bulls, 3–1. This win earned the team a spot in the Triple-A World Series, a postseason interleague championship series between the league champions of the IL and the Triple-A Pacific Coast League. Charlotte lost the Triple-A World Series versus the Vancouver Canadians, 3–2. Spencer was recognized as the IL Manager of the Year.

Jon Garland, later of the 2005 World Series champion White Sox, won the IL Most Valuable Pitcher Award in 2000 with the Knights. In 2003, second baseman Aaron Miles was the Rookie of the Year. Charlotte next qualified for the Governors' Cup playoffs in 2006 having won the Southern Division title, but they lost the semifinals to the Toledo Mud Hens, 3–1. Despite the early postseason exit, a pair of Knights were selected for IL awards. Heath Phillips was the Most Valuable Pitcher, and third baseman Josh Fields was the Rookie of the Year. The club's next playoff appearance came in 2012 after winning another Southern Division title. The defeated the Indianapolis Indians, 3–1, to reach the finals but were swept out of the championship round by the Pawtucket Red Sox in three games.

The Knights' attendance sagged after the turn of the millennium, in part because Knights Stadium was almost half an hour south of Charlotte. Many fans were unwilling to brave Interstate 77's infamous congestion in order to go to the stadium. In 2011, the Charlotte City Council and Mecklenburg County Commission approved a land-swap agreement which opened the door for the construction of a new 10,200-seat stadium in downtown Charlotte. The $54 million park, BB&T Ballpark, now Truist Field, opened in time for the 2014 season. It is located one block from Bank of America Stadium, home of the Carolina Panthers. To go along with the move, the Knights dropped the navy blue and dark green color scheme they had been using for the previous 15 years in favor of a new black-gold-silver palette, modeled on the color scheme of the White Sox. They also adopted new logos that focused more on the knight rather than his horse.

Charlotte hosted the 2016 Triple-A All-Star Game in which a team of International League All-Stars defeated the Pacific Coast League All-Stars, 4–2. The Knights narrowly missed the 2016 playoffs, finishing a half game behind the first-place Gwinnett Stripers. The start of the 2020 season was postponed due to the COVID-19 pandemic before being cancelled on June 30.

Triple-A East / International League (2021–present) 
Following the 2020 season, Major League Baseball assumed control of Minor League Baseball in a move to increase player salaries, modernize facility standards, and reduce travel. The Chicago White Sox retained Charlotte as their Triple-A affiliate, but the International League disbanded, and the Knights followed the other IL teams into the Triple-A East. Charlotte ended the season in seventh place in the Southeastern Division with a 45–75 record. No playoffs were held to determine a league champion; instead, the team with the best regular-season record was declared the winner. However, 10 games that had been postponed from the start of the season were reinserted into the schedule as a postseason tournament called the Triple-A Final Stretch in which all 30 Triple-A clubs competed for the highest winning percentage. Charlotte finished the tournament in 26th place with a 2–6 record. In 2022, the Triple-A East became known as the International League, the name historically used by the regional circuit prior to the 2021 reorganization.

Prior to the 2023 season, the Knights debuted redesigned logos and uniforms. They retained their gold, silver, and black colors with the addition of blue, which is used by the city's other teams, the Carolina Panthers, Charlotte FC, and Charlotte Hornets. The knight's helmet was redesigned, as was the "C" featured in their cap logo.

Season-by-season records

Radio and television

Matt Swierad has been the play-by-play announcer for Knights radio broadcasts since 1998. Live audio broadcasts are available online through the team's website and the MiLB First Pitch app. Games can be viewed through the MiLB.TV subscription feature of the official website of Minor League Baseball, with audio provided by a radio simulcast.

Roster

Awards 

Eleven players, one manager, and three executives have won league awards in recognition for their performance with Charlotte.

Managers
Charlotte has had 27 managers since their inaugural 1976 season.

References

Specific

General

External links

 
 Statistics from Baseball-Reference

 
1976 establishments in North Carolina
Baseball teams established in 1976
Baltimore Orioles minor league affiliates
Chicago Cubs minor league affiliates
Chicago White Sox minor league affiliates
Cleveland Guardians minor league affiliates
International League teams
Southern League (1964–present) teams
Miami Marlins minor league affiliates
Professional baseball teams in North Carolina
Professional baseball teams in South Carolina
Sports teams in Charlotte, North Carolina
Triple-A East teams